Evelyn John Shirley (26 April 1788 – 31 December 1856), was a British politician.

Background

Shirley was the eldest son of Evelyn Shirley, son of the Hon. George Shirley, younger son of Robert Shirley, 1st Earl Ferrers. His mother was Phillis Byam Wollaston, daughter of Charlton Wollaston. He was educated at Rugby School later Matriculating to St John's College, Cambridge in 1807.

He inherited Ettington Park, making some alterations to it in 1824.

Political career
After having served as High Sheriff of Warwickshire for 1813–14 and High Sheriff of Monaghan for 1824–25, Shirley was returned to Parliament for County Monaghan in 1826, a seat he held until 1831. He later represented Warwickshire South between 1836 and 1849.

Family
Shirley married Eliza, daughter of Arthur Stanhope, in 1810. They had several children, including Evelyn Shirley, also a politician, and Arthur Shirley (1813–1877), a Major-General in the Army. Shirley died in December 1856, aged 68. His wife survived him by three years and died in April 1859.

See also
Earl Ferrers

Notes

References

External links 

1788 births
1856 deaths
Alumni of St John's College, Cambridge
People educated at Rugby School
Members of the Parliament of the United Kingdom for County Monaghan constituencies (1801–1922)
Members of the Parliament of the United Kingdom for English constituencies
UK MPs 1826–1830
UK MPs 1830–1831
UK MPs 1835–1837
UK MPs 1837–1841
UK MPs 1841–1847
UK MPs 1847–1852
High Sheriffs of Warwickshire
High Sheriffs of Monaghan
Sheriffs of Warwickshire